The Soldier's Just Came Back is the fifth live album by the Japanese heavy metal band Loudness. It was released in 2001 only in Japan and recorded during the successful Spiritual Canoe tour with the original line-up. At the same time a VHS with the videotape of the concert was released by Nippon Columbia.

Track listings

CD
"Loudness" - 5:40
"In the Mirror" - 4:47
"Crazy Doctor" - 4:20
"Dream Fantasy" - 4:30
"Crazy Night" - 6:48
"The End of Earth" - 4:38
"How Many More Times" - 5:56
"Lonely Player" - 7:53
"Esper" - 3:48
"So Lonely (Japanese Version)" - 7:53
"Stay Wild" - 5:47
"S.D.I." - 4:56
"Speed" - 7:11
"Farewell" - 2:59

VHS
"Opening"
"Loudness"
"In the Mirror"
"Show Me the Way"
"Esper"
"Milky Way"
"Mr. Yesman"
"Black Wall"
"Devil Soldier"
"Street Woman"
"Lonely Player"
"The End of Earth"
"The Winds of Victory"
"Drum Solo"
"How Many More Times"
"Guitar Solo"
"Crazy Doctor"
"Dream Fantasy"
"Crazy Night"
"So Lonely (Japanese version)"
"Stay Wild"
"S.D.I."
"Speed"
"Farewell"

Personnel
Loudness
Minoru Niihara - vocals
Akira Takasaki - guitars
Masayoshi Yamashita - bass
Munetaka Higuchi - drums

Production
Toshi Nakashita - producer
Masatoshi Sakimoto - engineer, mixing at ESP Musical Academy Studio
Hiroyuki Hosaka - mastering
Eiichi Yamakawa - executive producer

References

2001 live albums
Loudness (band) live albums
Live video albums
Loudness (band) video albums
2001 video albums
Nippon Columbia live albums
Columbia Records video albums
Albums recorded at Nakano Sun Plaza
Japanese-language live albums